Nomitkon ( Nometkon,  Naumetkan, Yaghnobi Номиткон or Нӯмиткӯн) is a village in Sughd Region, northwestern Tajikistan. It is part of the jamoat Anzob in the Ayni District. Its population was 21 in 2007.

References

Populated places in Sughd Region
Yaghnob